) is a former Welsh language current affairs television programme for young people. It was produced for S4C by ITV Cymru Wales and broadcast on Thursday nights at 10.00pm. The programme, first broadcast in 2000, aimed to address issues and illustrate stories of interest to young people from all parts of Wales and beyond.

 was produced almost entirely by a young crew of journalists who researched, shot and edited their own material. The material for the programme was often but not always gathered on lightweight DVCAM cameras, typically the Sony DSR-500 or HVR-Z1E, and edited online using desktop editing software called Avid. In 2014 a website for young people was launched in conjunction with the team.

In July 2017, it was reported that the programme had been scrapped as part of a restructuring of S4C's current affairs output. In January 2018, ITV Cymru Wales launched a new current affairs series for the channel, .

References

2000 British television series debuts
2017 British television series endings
2000s Welsh television series
2010s Welsh television series
British children's television series
ITV regional news shows
S4C original programming